Jagot or Jagot colony is a small settlement in Gilgit district near the Karakoram Highway (previously the Silk Road). It is located a mile from the Jutal village. The settlement was formed by the migrant families, who were persecuted in their native village by majority sect in 1988 sectarian violence in Gilgit.

Places nearby
 Jutal
 Nomal
 Gujar Das

References

Populated places in Gilgit District